Hardt may refer to:

 Hardt (surname)
 Hardt, Westerwaldkreis, municipality in Rhineland-Palatinate, Germany
 Hardt, Baden-Württemberg, municipality in Baden-Württemberg, Germany
 Hardtwald, forest near Karlsruhe, Germany

See also 
 Haardt